People awarded the Honorary citizenship of the City of Moscow, Russia are:

Honorary Citizens of Moscow
Listed by date of award:

References

Moscow
Moscow
 
Russian awards